Sattleria styriaca is a moth in the family Gelechiidae. It was described by Pitkin and Sattler in 1991. It is found in the Alps of Austria.

The length of the forewings is 10-10.8 mm for males and about 7.6 mm for females. Adults are on wing from late July to the beginning of August.

References

Sattleria
Moths described in 1991